The Walla Walla Symphony is an orchestra based in Walla Walla, Washington. Founded in 1907, the Walla Walla Symphony is the "oldest continuously operating symphony west of the Mississippi". The current Music Director and Conductor is Yaacov Bergman, who has held the position since 1987. The Walla Walla Symphony performs most of its concerts in Cordiner Hall located on Whitman College Campus and provides several different types of concerts throughout the year.

History

The Walla Walla Symphony began with the formation of a "Symphony Club" in June 1907 by a small group who wanted to bring great music to their community. Following the adoption of a constitution and by-laws, the club's board of directors met for the first time on July 1. At a second meeting in September they voted to hire Edgar Fischer to direct an orchestra that would function as a separate entity from the music schools in the community.

The first performance of that 29-member group on December 12, 1907 was one of several activities during that season. The club held a series of meetings to study music, presented two more concerts, and sponsored a local performance by the nationally known New York Symphony Orchestra under the direction of Walter Damrosch. While that initial year was an exhilarating success, those that followed would be challenging as the orchestra's founders struggled with finances and often presented concerts to small audiences in less than ideal circumstances.

Following the unexpected death of Edgar Fischer at age 49 in 1922, and after two years of interim leadership, Fischer's wife, Alice, a talented pianist and singer, assumed direction of the group. At a time when women conductors were rare, she proved to be an effective and inspiring leader and led the orchestra until it celebrated its 25th anniversary in 1932.

Although the Symphony Club, renamed Symphony Society, continued without break as an organization through the Great Depression years, it suspended concerts during the season following the 25th because of financial conditions in the community. After it resumed concerts in 1934, four conductors led the group over the next eleven years, with Walter Wren and Frank Beezhold, both accomplished violinists, each serving for four years.

The orchestra grew and flourished under Beezhold's leadership during the World War II years, because of the location of an Army air force base and military hospital in the community, and a Naval V-12 training program at Whitman College. As the war ended in 1945, Beezhold left to be concertmaster of the Seattle Symphony Orchestra.

Since his departure there have been five conductors. William Bailey, a teacher at Whitman College, followed Beezhold and served for a record 24 years. Jose Rambaldi, his successor, also a Whitman College faculty member, led the orchestra until 1976. Following an interim search year with several conductors, R. Lee Friese became conductor in 1977. With his departure in 1986, Cindy Egolf Sham-Rao conducted during a search year that ended with the selection of Yaacov Bergman, present day conductor, who has conducted more concerts than any previous conductor.

Michael Wenberg, who joined the orchestra as a trombone player in 1998, was the orchestra's CEO from 2007 until his retirement in 2011. 

The current CEO is Leah Wilson-Velasco.

Music Directors and Conductors
 1907-1922 Edgar Fischer
 1922-1923 Gottfried Herbst
 1923-1924 Karel Havlicek
 1924-1934 Alice Reynolds Fischer
 1934-1936 Victor Johnson
 1936-1940 Walter Wren
 1940-1941 Frank Beezhold
 1941-1942 Nelson O. Schreiber
1942-1945 Frank Beezhold
 1945-1969 William H. Bailey
 1969-1976 Jose Rambaldi
 1977-1986 R. Lee Friese
 1986-1987 Cindy Egolf Sham-Rao
 1987–Present Yaacov Bergman

World Premiere Compositions
1981		Symphony No. 47, "Walla Walla, Land of Many Waters," Alan Hovhaness
1989 	 The Legend of Chief Joseph, John Verral
1993		Lyric Symphony, John Verral
1994		Escapade, Marvin Schluger
1995 	An American Concerto, Gwyneth Walker
1996	The Manhattan Jazz Suite, Marvin Schluger
1997 	Premiere Ouverture, Op. 23, Louise Farrenc (Modern World Premiere)
1998 	Jazz Rhapsody for Piano and Orchestra, Marvin Schluger
1998 	Christmas Fantasy for Jazz Quintet and Orchestra, David Glenn
2001 	Symphony No. 2, John David Earnest
2001		Overture to the Millenium, Marvin Schluger
2001		Artist Portraits, David Glenn
2001 	Chant and Improvisation, Tom Simon
2002		Piano Concerto, Tania Cronin
2005		Svanen, Elfrida Andrée (Modern World Premiere)
2006	 Chasing the Light, William Berry
2006 	Variations on a Gregorian Chant for Jazz Trio and Orchestra, Tom Simon
2007		Great River Percussion Concerto, Forrest Pierce
2007 	A Valley of Streams for Jazz Quintet and Orchestra, David Glenn
2009 	A Hamchilla Holiday, Parker Davis
2010 	Blessings From the Children, Gwyneth Walker
2011 	FanTAStic! A Celebration of 25 Fantastic Years, William Berry

References

 Shultz, D. (2006). "A Dream Fulfilled"

External links
 
 A Dream Fulfilled by Dan Shultz
Walla Walla Symphony records at the Whitman College and Northwest Archives, Whitman College.

American orchestras
Musical groups from Washington (state)
Walla Walla, Washington
Musical instrument libraries
Musical groups established in 1907
Performing arts in Washington (state)